Albert Milambo-Mutamba, known as Mutamba Milambo (born 1 December 1984, in Mbuji-Mayi) is a Congolese former professional footballer who played as a midfielder.

He was a member of the Congolese 2006 African Nations Cup team, who progressed to the quarter finals, where they were eliminated by Egypt, who eventually won the tournament.

External links

1984 births
Living people
People from Kasaï-Oriental
Association football midfielders
Democratic Republic of the Congo footballers
Democratic Republic of the Congo international footballers
Democratic Republic of the Congo expatriate footballers
2006 Africa Cup of Nations players
Ligue 2 players
AS Vita Club players
AS Beauvais Oise players
AS Cannes players
Le Havre AC players
Progresso Associação do Sambizanga players
C.D. Primeiro de Agosto players
Académica Petróleos do Lobito players
Democratic Republic of the Congo expatriate sportspeople in France
Expatriate footballers in France
Democratic Republic of the Congo expatriate sportspeople in Angola
Expatriate footballers in Angola